Sonatane Takulua (born 11 January 1991) is a Tongan rugby union player. He plays in the Scrum-Half position for the French based Top 14 side, Toulon. Takulua also represents Tonga at international level.

Early life
Takalua was born in Lapaha, Tonga and moved to New Zealand with his family when he was 11.

Career
In 2012, Takulua was signed by  after a year on a development contract.

On 26 February 2015. Takulua left Northland to sign for English side Newcastle Falcons in the Premiership Rugby with immediate effect. His impressive performances led him to sign a four-year contract extension to stay with the club until 2022.

On 24 February 2020, Takulua was granted his early release from Newcastle to sign for French giants Toulon in the Top 14 competition with immediate effect.

References

External links
 
 

Living people
1991 births
Tongan expatriate rugby union players
Tonga international rugby union players
Northland rugby union players
Rugby union scrum-halves
Tongan emigrants to New Zealand
Tongan rugby union players
People from Tongatapu